Buštěhrad is a town in Kladno District in the Central Bohemian Region of the Czech Republic. It has about 3,700 inhabitants.

Etymology
The settlement was originally named Buščeves, which was derived from Buškova ves (i.e. "Bušek's village"). After the village became a town, the name was changed to Buckow and the local castle was called Buštěhrad (meaning "Bušek's castle"). In the 19th century, the name of the castle was transferred to the town.

Geography
It lies in a flat agricultural landscape of the Prague Plateau. The Buštěhradský Stream springs in the municipal territory, flows through the town, and supplies two small ponds in the town centre.

History
The first written mention of Buštěhrad is from 1209. In the 13th century, a fortress was built here, later rebuilt into a castle, which was one of the biggest in the kingdom in the 15th century. In 1497, Buštěhrad was promoted to a town by King Vladislaus II.

During the Thirty Years' War, the castle was destroyed. After the war, houses were built in the ruins, and it became a unique quarter, today called Starý Hrad ("Old Castle"). In the 19th century, the town developed thanks to coal mining and construction of the railway.

Demographics

Transport
The D7 motorway from Prague to Chomutov leads along the eastern municipal border.

Sights

The most important monument is the Buštěhrad Castle. It was built in 1747–1753 by Kilian Ignaz Dientzenhofer and Anselmo Lurago. Neoclassical modifications were made in the 19th century. Today the castle is dilapidated. There is a castle park in front of the castle and a church next to the castle. The Church of the Exaltation of the Holy Cross was built in 1814–1816.

Notable people
Ota Pavel (1930–1973), writer and journalist; raised here
Jiří Krampol (born 1938), actor
Eduard Novák (1946–2010), ice hockey player

Twin towns – sister cities

Buštěhrad is twinned with:
 Ledro, Italy

References

External links

Cities and towns in the Czech Republic
Populated places in Kladno District